The 1996 UAW-GM Quality 500 was the 28th stock car race of the 1996 NASCAR Winston Cup Series and the 37th iteration of the event. The race was held on Sunday, October 6, 1996, in Concord, North Carolina, at Charlotte Motor Speedway, a 1.5 miles (2.4 km) permanent quad-oval. The race took the scheduled 334 laps to complete. In the late stages of the race, Hendrick Motorsports driver Terry Labonte would manage to make a late-race charge to the front, managing to close and come within one point of teammate Jeff Gordon in the point standings after a late season slump by Gordon. The win was Labonte's 18th career NASCAR Winston Cup Series victory and his second and final victory of the season. To fill out the top three, Roush Racing driver Mark Martin and Robert Yates Racing driver Dale Jarrett would finish second and third, respectively.

Background 

Charlotte Motor Speedway is a motorsports complex located in Concord, North Carolina, United States 13 miles from Charlotte, North Carolina. The complex features a 1.5 miles (2.4 km) quad oval track that hosts NASCAR racing including the prestigious Coca-Cola 600 on Memorial Day weekend and the NEXTEL All-Star Challenge, as well as the UAW-GM Quality 500. The speedway was built in 1959 by Bruton Smith and is considered the home track for NASCAR with many race teams located in the Charlotte area. The track is owned and operated by Speedway Motorsports Inc. (SMI) with Marcus G. Smith (son of Bruton Smith) as track president.

Entry list 

 (R) denotes rookie driver.

Qualifying 
Qualifying was split into two rounds. The first round was held on Wednesday, October 2, at 3:00 PM EST. Each driver would have one lap to set a time. During the first round, the top 25 drivers in the round would be guaranteed a starting spot in the race. If a driver was not able to guarantee a spot in the first round, they had the option to scrub their time from the first round and try and run a faster lap time in a second round qualifying run, held on Thursday, October 3, at 1:30 PM EST. As with the first round, each driver would have one lap to set a time. For this specific race, positions 26-38 would be decided on time, and depending on who needed it, a select amount of positions were given to cars who had not otherwise qualified but were high enough in owner's points.

Five drivers would fail to qualify: Joe Nemechek, Gary Bradberry, Dave Marcis, Robbie Faggart, and Delma Cowart.

Full qualifying results

Race results

References 

1996 NASCAR Winston Cup Series
NASCAR races at Charlotte Motor Speedway
October 1996 sports events in the United States
1996 in sports in North Carolina